The Mysterious Benedict Society is a novel written by Trenton Lee Stewart and illustrated by Carson Ellis, first published in 2007. It tells the story of four gifted children: Reynie Muldoon, George "Sticky" Washington, Kate Wetherall, and Constance Contraire, who form the "Mysterious Benedict Society" and are sent to investigate an institution called L.I.V.E. (the Learning Institute for the Very Enlightened), run by a man named Ledroptha Curtain. The book is the first in a series that has sold over three million copies.

Plot 
We start off our story with Reynie Muldoon, an orphan, waiting to enter a building for the next stage of administration. The first test had already been unusual, with questions like “Are you brave?” and “Do you like to watch television.” The next stage was no less strange, with impossible questions and hidden puzzle that gives you all the answers. While waiting for the third test, Reynie meets Sticky and Kate. Sticky has a amazing memory and is very shy. He passed the test by sheer memory of all the questions. Kate, on the other hand, didn't pass the second test. However, she got the test administrator out of a sticky situation. She is very outgoing and is extremely athletic. She also carries a bucket around at all times. The third stage of testing is to simply cross a room without your feet touching any black and yellow squares. However, the whole room is covered in black and yellow! Sticky crosses the room on his hands and knees, and Kate crosses using acrobatics, but Reynie just laughs and walks right across. It turns out that the floor was actually covered in rectangles, not squares. The fourth stage of testing is a maze, and the clue is “You should be able to do it with your eyes closed." Kate crawls through the air ducts, and Sticky makes his way by pure memorization, and Reynie follows textured arrows on the side panels through the maze. After passing all the tests, the three children are called to meet Mr Benedict, the reason they were all here. They were joined by another, extremely cranky little girl named Constance. Then Mr Benedict tells them all about the Emergency, which is a worldwide belief that everything is out of control, and how a man named Ledroptha Curtain created it and plans to use it to take over the world. He runs L.I.V.E, a school situated on Nomanson island, where the only entrance is a bridge, or be torn to bits in the rocky waters. Just after Mr Benedict finishes explaining, an alarm buzzer blares. Constance runs away in fear and gets caught by the Recruiters, hired kidnappers that bring kids to L.I.V.E. Milligan, one of Mr Benedict’s assistants, fights the ten men and gets Constance back. Later that evening, the four children get together and name themselves “The Mysterious Benedict Society.” The next day, the team goes to L.I.V.E to register. After settling in, they learn that to stop Mr Curtain, they must become messengers. They also learn that the two guides, named Jackson and Jillson, were executives, which is basically when a messenger gets promoted. They then go to classes and find the classes strange. However, Sticky and Reynie quickly master the material and become Messengers. They also find out that Mr Curtain is actually Mr Benedict’s twin brother and that he can “brainsweep” people by erasing their memories. Soon, Reynie and Sticky are called to Mr Curtain’s office for their “Secret privileges.” They find out that he is using a device called the Whisperer, which looks like a big, metal, chair to broadcast the message that everything is out of control to the world. Later, Kate finds out that Mr Curtain plans to unleash his evil plan in three days. The team gives the entire school food poisoning so the boys can get into the whispering chamber in time to stop Mr Curtain. The plan works and the boys get into the whispering chamber. Reynie signals to the girls and they come running. The executives follow them, and a fight occurs. Kate sends Constance to the boys and engages the executives. She’s losing badly when Milligan appears and stops them. It turns out that Milligan was Kate’s father and a secret agent before Mr Curtain brainsweeped him. Kate gets up to the whispering chamber just as Mr Curtain tries to brainsweep them. However, Constance gets into the Whisperer and begins to fight him mentally. Constance wins and they open up a secret passageway with Mr Benedict and his associates. They all get off the island, but Mr Curtain also escapes with some recruiters and executives. At a party at Mr Benedict’s house, the team learns that Constance is actually three, which explains why she is so cranky. In the end, everybody has a happy ending.

Characters

Main characters
Reynard "Reynie" Muldoon is an eleven-year-old boy living at Stonetown Orphanage. He is talented at problem-solving, logical deduction, and perceiving people's emotions. His intelligence results in the assignment of a special tutor at the orphanage, Miss Perumal, who later adopts him. Reynie looks between the lines, observing and questioning, and solves most problems by looking for a "puzzle" within the situation. He is described as an especially average-looking boy with average brown hair, average pale complexion, and average clothes. 
George "Sticky" Washington, is an eleven-year-old, bald, tea-skinned boy. He has a great memory (everything "sticks" in his head, hence his nickname) and a talent for reading quickly. He is timid and nervous and resorts to polishing his glasses in stressful situations. He ran away from his parents because they forced him into academic competitions and he thought they no longer wanted him around.
Kate Wetherall is a twelve-year-old girl who is sporty, dexterous, strong, creative, cheerful and optimistic. After being orphaned, she ran away to the circus. She has blonde hair, blue eyes, and fair skin. She carries a red bucket containing various items which she thinks are useful, including an army knife, a flashlight, a pen, a rope, a bag of marbles, a slingshot, a spool of clear fishing twine, a horseshoe magnet and a spyglass disguised as a kaleidoscope. Kate's mother died when she was a baby and believes her father left her (when she was young) because of her mother's tragic death. She loves to call herself, "the Great Kate Weather Machine".
Constance Contraire is a small, extremely intelligent, and stubborn girl. She has the ability to write clever and brutal poems, and her ultra-sensitive mind is most affected by the Whisperer. By the novel's end, she is also Mr. Benedict's adopted daughter and also reveals that she is only 3 years old. She tends to make the other members angry, but they aren't able to stay mad at her for a long time.  
Milligan is a former government agent and current guard for the children, Rhonda, Number Two, and Mr. Benedict. He is a sad and somber man, even described as a "scarecrow" due to his shabby and depressing demeanor. His sadness is attributed to his kidnapping by secret agents after which he was brainwashed and lost his memory. Although unsure of his actual name, "Milligan" was the first word he remembered on regaining consciousness, and he adopted it as his name. He later recovers his memory and remembers / discovers he is Kate's father. Milligan also has flax blond hair and ocean blue eyes.
Mr. Nicholas Benedict is a middle-aged man who recruits the children. He is the one who discovered the plans of his identical twin brother, Ledroptha Curtain, from whom he was separated just after birth because their parents had died.  Mr. Benedict suffers from narcolepsy, which causes him to fall asleep when experiencing strong emotions (usually laughter).
Ledroptha Curtain is the antagonist of the story and the head of the "Learning Institute for the Very Enlightened", or L.I.V.E. and "The Emergency" are his tools for creating mass panic and destabilizing the world's major governments. Mr. Curtain created the mind-control and mind-message transmitter device called "the Whisperer", which utilizes children's minds to spread propaganda and subliminal messages through television as part of a scheme to usurp control of the entire world and be declared "Minister And Secretary of all the Earth's Regions" (M.A.S.T.E.R.). He is also revealed to be Mr. Benedict's long-lost twin brother. He uses a modified wheelchair to get around and wears mirrored sunglasses in order to conceal his narcolepsy. Mr. Curtain's narcolepsy is triggered by anger, as a foil to his twin's laughter-induced narcolepsy.

Supporting characters
S.Q. Pedalian is an Executive working for Mr. Curtain. He is dim-witted and clumsy but is the only Executive who is kind to the Mysterious Benedict Society. He is also somewhat oblivious to the evils of Mr. Curtain, the Institute, and the Whisperer's effects on the world's inhabitants. 
Jackson and Jillson are the Head Executives at the Institute and are noted for their unkind ways. Jackson has icy blue eyes, is stockily built, and has a nose long and sharp like a knife. Jillson is six feet tall, has small piggy eyes, and "arms like a monkey"
Martina Crowe is originally a Messenger and later Executive at the Institute. She despises the members of the Mysterious Benedict Society because she feels threatened by their intelligence, but holds particular enmity for Kate.
Miss Perumal is Reynie's tutor. She is Indian and is intelligent and friendly. She eventually adopts Reynie in the end.
Mr. Rutger is the Stonetown Orphanage director. Although not unkind, he is blinded by greed to Reynie's obvious higher educational needs. He gets paid for each student so he doesn't let Reynie go to an advanced school.
The Helpers make food, do laundry, and perform other manual labor tasks at the Institute. They are not allowed to talk to any students at L.I.V.E. or make eye contact. They share the same vacant, sad expressions as Milligan, and Reynie soon discovers that the Helpers may have been brought to the Institute against their wills and have been brainwashed.
The Recruiters kidnap children for the Institute, to be used for Mr. Curtain's Whisperer messages. In the following books The Mysterious Benedict Society and the Perilous Journey and The Mysterious Benedict Society and the Prisoner's Dilemma, they evolve into the Ten Men, so named for their ten ways of hurting people.
Number Two and Rhonda Kazembe are the over-protective assistants of Mr. Benedict. They have passed all his tests, and now do everything he asks them to do (except to let him stand up without at least one of them in the room). Rhonda is a Zambian woman who makes a convincing 12-year-old in height even though she's in her twenties. Number Two can mostly be noted for her resemblance of a pencil when wearing her yellow coat, with yellow skin and red hair.

Critical reception 
The Mysterious Benedict Society has received generally positive reviews. Many critics praised the enigmatic plot and puzzles included in the storyline; journalist Michele Norris, writing for NPR, said, "Almost everything inside this book is an enigma." Additionally, the ethical decisions and moral lessons contained within the book were praised. Kirkus Reviews said that the book was "rich in moral and ethical issues." Rick Riordan, author of the Percy Jackson & the Olympians series, wrote, "I enjoyed it very much -- great cast of characters, lots of cool puzzles and mysteries. The book made me feel nostalgic, because it reminded me of some of the better children’s books I grew up with, like Charlie and the Chocolate Factory and The Phantom Tollbooth."

Awards
The Mysterious Benedict Society was a New York Times bestseller in 2008 and won a 2007 Booklist Editors' Choice: Books for Youth award, a 2008 Notable Children's Book for Middle Readers award from the American Library Association, the 2008 E.B. White Read Aloud Award for Older Readers, and a 2008 Texas Lone Star Reading List award.

Sequels
Three sequels were published in 2008, 2009, and 2019: The Mysterious Benedict Society and the Perilous Journey, The Mysterious Benedict Society and the Prisoner's Dilemma, and The Mysterious Benedict Society and the Riddle of Ages.

A prequel, The Extraordinary Education of Nicholas Benedict, was released on April 10, 2012.

A supplementary book, The Mysterious Benedict Society: Mr. Benedict's Book of Perplexing Puzzles, Elusive Enigmas, and Curious Conundrums, was also released.

Television adaptation
The novel served as the basis for the first season of the television series of the same name. Like most adaptations, there are numerous divergences, most of them revolving around giving more establishment and agency to the series. The biggest difference is that the show adds more background to Mr. Benedict and Dr. Curtain, the story of which somewhat contradicts the novel The Extraordinary Education of Nicholas Benedict. Characters such as Number Two, Ms. Perumal, Rhonda Kazembe and Milligan are also given more development than the novel.

While the Society's background are relatively unchanged, Sticky now lives with his aunt and uncle instead of his parents and Constance is aged up and given a more sarcastic disposition. The characterizations of characters such as Jackson and Jillson and Martina are radically altered, specifically with the latter who, unlike her novel counterpart, reforms at the end. A lot of the challenges and puzzles were changed to appear even more difficult than those featured in the novel.

The series is also more grounded and makes the issues feel more relevant. One of the prime examples being the explanation for Mr. Benedict's machine. In the novel, he states that he cannot go to the police about his findings because they will not understand it, while in the series, he states that it is due to the fact that some people will simply refuse to believe him.

References

External links
An interview with the author, Trenton Lee Stewart
The official website for The Mysterious Benedict Society

2007 American novels
American children's novels
American adventure novels
2007 children's books